Robert E. "Bob" Trow (February 6, 1926 – November 2, 1998) was an American radio celebrity, actor, and craftsman.

Raised in the Beltzhoover neighborhood of Pittsburgh, Pennsylvania, United States, Trow began his career in radio. He later became well known for his acting roles on Mister Rogers' Neighborhood as Bob Dog, Robert Troll, and Harriet Elizabeth Cow, characters from the Neighborhood of Make-Believe. In the real-life segments of Mr. Rogers' show, he would also appear as himself, and he had a workshop which Mr. Rogers would visit on occasion to examine his latest creations and share them with his viewers. Trow built all of the set models used in the Neighborhood of Make-Believe segments as well as a number of specialty props, sketches and paintings.

Trow was also an artist and sang in vocal groups in the Pittsburgh area. It was the performance of one of his vocal groups in the early 1950s that caught the attention of radio host Rege Cordic, who offered to manage Trow's group. Discovering Trow's ability to develop comedic material and portray diverse characters, Rege invited Trow to join him on WWSW as a writer and voice actor. Trow created a number of character voices, including the beloved Brunhilda (350 pounds of loveliness), Milkman, Carmen Monoxide (the punster who would later run for president), Max Korfendigas (the drunken golf pro) and more who became a regular part of the long-running Cordic & Company morning show.

The show moved across town to KDKA in 1954. When Cordic left for Los Angeles in 1965, Trow was added to the KDKA staff and did the morning show with Art Pallan, continuing the characters. Pallan and Trow lasted two and a half years on KDKA.

After the show left the air, Trow did hundreds of radio and television commercials in the Pittsburgh area. In addition to performing, he also wrote many of the award-winning commercials he was involved in. He spent many years in advertising as Vice President and Creative Director for George Hill Company, where he developed memorable ad campaigns for Horne's Department Stores, Parkvale Savings, Willi's Ski Shops, Great American Federal, and many more. Trow was inducted into the Pittsburgh Advertising Hall of Fame "post humorously" (as he would say) in 1999.

Trow died at his home in New Alexandria, Pennsylvania, in 1998 at age 72 of a heart attack. His ashes are buried in Union Cemetery in New Alexandria, the grave marked by a headstone bearing his name, the date of his birth, the date of his death, and the epitaph "Rest assured."

References

External links 
 
 Cordic & Company tribute site on Wayback Machine
Barbara Vancheri and Adrian McCoy (1998). Pittsburgh Post-Gazette: Obituary of Bob Trow. Retrieved January 24, 2007.

1926 births
1998 deaths
American male television actors
American radio personalities
Male actors from Pittsburgh
Apex Records artists
20th-century American male actors
Burials in Pennsylvania